Trichilia grandifolia is a species of plant in the family Meliaceae. It is endemic to São Tomé Island.

References

Flora of São Tomé Island
Endemic flora of São Tomé and Príncipe
grandifolia
Near threatened plants
Taxonomy articles created by Polbot
Taxa named by Daniel Oliver